Chu Ming (born 24 September 1932) is a Hong Kong athlete. He competed in the men's long jump and the men's triple jump at the 1964 Summer Olympics.

References

External links
 

1932 births
Living people
Athletes (track and field) at the 1964 Summer Olympics
Hong Kong male long jumpers
Hong Kong male triple jumpers
Olympic athletes of Hong Kong
Place of birth missing (living people)